Pangbourne railway station serves the village of Pangbourne in the county of Berkshire, and across the River Thames the village of Whitchurch-on-Thames, in Oxfordshire. The station is served by local services operated by Great Western Railway.

Pangbourne station is located close to the village centre, with main station buildings on the opposite side of the railway to the village. It has two platforms, one on each of the relief (slow) lines, whilst the fast lines pass behind the station. The platforms are linked to each other and the station entrance, on the up relief platform, by a pedestrian underpass.

Originally, the station also had platforms (the former 1 & 2) on the main (fast) lines; as such, the current Platforms 1 & 2 were Platforms 3 & 4 respectively. Some signs of their previous existence are still visible adjacent to (the current) Platform 1. A consequence of their removal is that when the relief lines are closed for engineering work, local stopping services cannot call at Pangbourne, and a replacement bus service is required.

History 

Services 
Services run every 30 minutes in each direction Monday to Saturday and hourly on Sundays. Typical journey times are approximately 20 minutes to Didcot Parkway, 35 minutes to Oxford, 10 minutes to Reading, and approximately 1 hour 15 minutes to London Paddington. Most services are run using Class 387 Electrostar trains in 8 coach formation. Due to short platforms, it used to only be possible to unlock the front 7 coaches, however thanks to a platform extension in 2019, all 8 coaches now have full access to the station.

References

External links 

 Train times and station information, from National Rail

Railway stations in Berkshire
DfT Category E stations
Former Great Western Railway stations
Railway stations in Great Britain opened in 1840
Great Western Main Line
Railway stations served by Great Western Railway